City of Vicenza and the Palladian Villas of the Veneto is a World Heritage Site in Italy, which protects buildings by the architect Andrea Palladio. UNESCO inscribed the site on the World Heritage List in 1994. At first the site was called "Vicenza, City of Palladio" and only buildings in the immediate area of Vicenza were included.

Various types of buildings were represented in the original site, which included the Basilica Palladiana, Teatro Olimpico and palazzi in the city itself, along with a few villas in the vicinity. However, most of Palladio's surviving villas lay outside the site. In 1996 the site was expanded. Its present name reflects the fact that it includes all the Palladian Villas of the Veneto. City of Vicenza and the Palladian Villas of the Veneto also has some examples of ecclesiastical architecture, including the relatively small church at Maser. In total there are 47 Palladian buildings registered in the UNESCO list in the Veneto region.

There is another important group of urban buildings by Palladio in Venice, a city which also has World Heritage Site status. Venice has notable examples of ecclesiastical architecture by Palladio, including the San Giorgio Maggiore (church), Venice.

List of sites in the center of Vicenza
The World Heritage List have been registered since 1994: the historic center of Vicenza with the 23 Palladian monuments located within the ancient medieval walls of the city.

List of villas 
Later in 1996, the site was extended by inserting another 24 Palladian villas distributed in the Veneto region

See also
 Palladian architecture

References

External links

 Palladio Museum
 Architectural Reference drawings of The Villas of Palladio
Palladio and Britain  Online exhibition from the Royal Institute of British Architects 
Palladio and The Veneto Online exhibition from the Royal Institute of British Architects 
Palladio Centre and Museum in Vicenza, Italy 
The Center for Palladian Studies in America, Inc.
Palladio's Italian Villas website which includes material by the owners of Villa Cornaro
Official Website of the 500 Years Exhibition in Vicenza – Italy (2008) 
Quincentenary of Andrea Palladio's birth –  Celebration Committee Describes a major exhibition touring venues in Italy, the United Kingdom, and the United States
Year of Palladio
Andrea Palladio on Empty Canon
Andrea Palladio: His Life and Legacy, at the Royal Academy, review, The Telegraph, 2 February 2009
How I Spent A Few Days in Palladio's World, The Wall Street Journal, 3 March 2009
All He Surveyed, Paul Goldberger, The New Yorker, 30 March 2009
Principles of Palladio's Architecture: II, Journal of the Warburg and Courtauld Institutes, 1945
Nature and Antiquity in the Work of Andrea Palladio, Journal of the Society of Architectural Historians, September 2000
Digital images of 1721 and 1742 edition of The architecture of A. Palladio
Quattro libri dell'architettura From the Rare Book and Special Collections Division at the Library of Congress
Andrea Palladio Architecture on Google Maps
Bertotti Scamozzi, Ottavio, "Le fabbriche e i disegni di Andrea Palladio : raccolta ed illustrati" 1776

 

Palladio